Yevsei Grigorievich Vainrub (in Barysaw, Russian Empire – 20 March 2003 in Ashdod, Israel) was a Soviet Colonel during World War II, Commander of the 219th Tank Brigade, Hero of the Soviet Union. He was an older brother of Hero of the Soviet Union Matvei Vainrub.

References 

1909 births
2003 deaths
People from Barysaw
People from Ashdod
Belarusian Jews
Belarusian emigrants to Israel
Soviet military personnel of World War II
Heroes of the Soviet Union
Soviet emigrants to Israel
Soviet Jews in the military
Recipients of the Order of Lenin
Recipients of the Order of the Red Banner
Recipients of the Order of Kutuzov, 2nd class
Recipients of the Medal of Zhukov
Recipients of the Patriotic Order of Merit
Recipients of the Order of the Cross of Grunwald, 3rd class